Christina Ann Snyder (born May 27, 1947) is a senior United States district judge of the United States District Court for the Central District of California.

Early life and education 
Snyder was born on May 27, 1947 in Los Angeles, California. In 1969, Snyder received a Bachelor of Arts degree from Pomona College. In 1972, Snyder earned a Juris Doctor from Stanford Law School.

Career 
In 1972, Snyder practiced law in California until 1997. Snyder was a partner in Wyman Bautzer Kuchel & Silbert, Katten Muchin & Zavis and Corinblit & Selzer.

Federal judicial service 
On January 7, 1997, Snyder was nominated by President Bill Clinton to a seat on the United States District Court for the Central District of California vacated by Edward Rafeedie. Snyder was confirmed by the United States Senate on November 7, 1997, and received her commission on November 10, 1997.
Snyder assumed senior status on November 23, 2016.

Awards 
 2013 Ronald M. George Award for Judicial Excellence from the Beverly Hills Bar Association (February 20, 2013).

See also
List of Jewish American jurists

References

External links 
 Christina Snyder at votesmart.org

1947 births
Living people
Pomona College alumni
Stanford Law School alumni
Judges of the United States District Court for the Central District of California
United States district court judges appointed by Bill Clinton
People from Los Angeles
20th-century American judges
21st-century American judges
20th-century American women judges
21st-century American women judges